Badri Prasad Pandey is a Nepalese politician, belonging to the Nepali Congress currently serving as the member of the 2nd Federal Parliament of Nepal. In the 2022 Nepalese general election, he won the election from Bajura 1 (constituency).

References

Living people
Nepal MPs 2022–present
Nepali Congress politicians from Sudurpashchim Province
1974 births